hr-skyline was a German, public radio station owned and operated by the Hessischer Rundfunk (HR).

History
Hr-skyline's main focus was on economic reporting. To underline this focus, the studios of hr-skyline was located in Frankfurt's Bankenviertel on the 54th floor of the Main Tower. Its successor hr-info has taken over this focus in part, but is increasingly aimed at sports and culture lovers.

References

Defunct radio stations in Germany
Radio stations established in 1998
Radio stations disestablished in 2004
1998 establishments in Germany
2004 disestablishments in Germany
Mass media in Frankfurt
Hessischer Rundfunk